The UP–UST rivalry is a team rivalry between the athletic teams of the University of the Philippines (UP) and the University of Santo Tomas (UST) in the University Athletic Association of the Philippines (UAAP).

The matchup, in many occasions, is called "Church vs State" or "Battle of the Church and State", because UST is a pontifical university, is run by the Roman Catholic Order of Preachers, and labels itself as "The Catholic University of the Philippines", while UP is run by the Philippine government, is seen as the Philippines' de facto national university, and is the only public university in the UAAP. The rivalry became popular in the UAAP Cheerdance Competition in the late 1990s to 2000s between the UP Pep Squad and the UST Salinggawi Dance Troupe. Both schools placed in the competition annually from 1999 to 2008 - the longest joint podium finishes by cheerdance teams in UAAP history. In 2012, 16 out of the 18 UAAP Cheerdance titles were won by either UP or UST. In UAAP Season 82 in 2019, it gained a renewed prominence when the UP Fighting Maroons and the UST Growling Tigers men's basketball teams played each other four times in the season. The basketball games with the highest attendance in 2019 had either UP or UST in it.

Cheerdance

The UST Salinggawi Dance Troupe won the first three Cheering Competition titles from 1994 to 1996. The UP Filipiniana Dance Group was sent as UP's representative during the early years of the competition. In 2001, the UP Pep Squad matched UST's record of winning three consecutive titles. UST achieved a rare 5-peat championship from 2002 to 2006, while UP placed constantly placed as runners-up. From 2007 to 2012, UP became champions five out of six times.

Early years
UST won the first UAAP Cheering Competition on August 13, 1994, the same year that the UP Pep Squad was founded. The competition was held at the Cuneta Astrodome. UST's contingent was composed of Salinggawi, a cheerleading class, and head cheerers.

Salinggawi won the same competition the following year with a flawless performance and more difficult stunts.

In 1996, UST achieved its first 3-peat championship in the third Jollibee "Chi-cheer Kayo" Challenge. UST focused on the creative stunts more than the traditional elements. Salinggawi's routine included its signature Spider Pyramid to score 91.70%. UP finished second with 88.86. UP, together with DLSU, complained about the deductions. Three-point deductions were given to the top three teams, UST, UP, and DLSU, for not performing in the order of performance.

The UP Pep Squad, under coach Lalaine Pereña, earned its first title in 1999.

2000s
Both UP and UST became trendsetters and claimed many firsts in the competition. UP claimed to be the first to adopt an overall theme in the routine. UST is also said to be the first to use canned music and to eliminate the classic pompoms.

In 2002, Salinggawi won and averted the UP Pep Squad from getting their fourth consecutive championship. Ryan Silva, UST's new choreographer, used a medley of movie soundtracks from Bring It On, Blade, and Joy Ride to execute  the sky-diving and scorpion-like floor maneuvers. UP asserted their creativity and uniqueness by incorporating tap dance and jump ropes to their routine, which was still devoid of canned music. Salinggawi finished first with 87.38%, while UP Pep Squad obtained 84% for a third-place finish.

The following year, UST retained the title with their rhythmic and fast-paced modern and ballet dances. Salinggawi used local hits such as Mr. Suave and Legs, and soundtracks from Charlie's Angels and Tomb Raider. UST finished with 89.50%, while UP came in second place with 88.16%. UP Pep used canned music for the first time in their high difficulty sports aerobics and Filipiniana-influenced routine.

Salinggawi achieved a 3-peat in 2004. The group danced to the tunes of the late 1990s. Among the highlights of UST's routine were the inclusion of Capoiera and the Helicopter toss stunt. UST finished with 93.61%, while UP ranked second with 90.56%. UP Pep Squad showcased a "back-to-basics cheerleading" routine.

UST's fifth straight championship made them the winningest team in 2006. Salinggawi's routine included "Spiderman walk" and "Superman lift" to score 94.96% and defeat UP Pep Squad's capoeira-inspired routine. UP slipped to third place at 91.7%.

In 2007, a rock-themed UP Pep Squad dethroned Salinggawi, which sported a bumblebee-inspired routine. UP garnered an over-all score of 92.66%,  beating UST by just 0.5 points. After the announcement of UP's win, the members of Salinggawi approached and warmly congratulated their rivals.

2010s
In 2012, UP Pep Squad tied Salinggawi's eight titles with their "Freedom" routine. All of the members of the UP Pep Squad shaved their heads for their performance.

UP's protest in 2015

Results

UAAP halftime performances

Men's basketball

UP dominance
In 2016, the UP Fighting Maroons defeated the UST Growling Tigers after 10 years or 19 games in a Maroon-packed Filoil Flying V Centre in San Juan. UP, with a new coach, Bo Perasol, dominated the match and held a game-high 15-point lead at the start of the fourth quarter. Paul Desiderio led the Maroons with 16 points. The Maroons won 5 games in 2016, their most wins since 2006.

In the first round of 2017, UST almost had the victory after Marvin Lee gave the Tigers a 2-point advantage. UP's Paul Desiderio, who previously struggled at the 3-point line, shouted during the final time-out, "Atin 'to, papasok 'to." He hit the game-winning triple with 1.1 seconds remaining and led the Maroons with 17 points. "Atin 'to!" became UP's battle cry for years to come.

After the game, UST's The Varsitarian posted on Twitter, "UP grabbed only its second win against the Tigers in 12 years. #UAAPSeason80" The UP's The Philippine Collegian responded, "Remedies to sorrow, by St. Thomas Aquinas: the truth, sympathy of friends, crying, sleeping, a nice bath. #UAAPSeason80 #UPFight #taaskamao"

For the first time since 2006, UP swept the 2-game series against UST. Janjan Jaboneta made all his 4 3-pointers to lead the Maroons with 12 points in the second-round game. UP finished the season in fifth place, while UST took the last.

With a new coach, Aldin Ayo, UST ended the 3-game winning streak of UP in the 2018 season.  Rookie CJ Cansino's high percentage shooting led the Tigers to win the first round. The Tigers put up more points in the first quarter (31 points) than the Maroons did in the entire first half (29 points). UST had a 30-point advantage in the third quarter, 71–41.

In the second-round game, CJ Cansino sustained a season-ending injury to his left knee. Bright Akhuetie, eventual Most Valuable Player of UAAP Season 81, posted a double-double of 25 points and 18 rebounds to beat UST, while UP team captain Paul Desiderio had 19 points. UP's win eliminated UST from the final four contention. The UP Fighting Maroons eventually made it to the final four for the first time in 21 years, and to the finals after 32 years.

2019

In the round 1 match-up, 2018's sixth-place UST won against the playoffs favorite UP. The Tigers were bannered by rookies and eventual season's Most Valuable Player and Rookie of the Year, Soulémane Chabi Yo and Mark Nonoy respectively. UST capitalized on UP rookie Kobe Paras' absence, an eventual season Mythical 5 member, to win. In the round 2 match-up, UST made a team record of 16 3-pointers, the most by any team that year, to sweep UP in Season 82. Kobe Paras sustained a shoulder injury early in the game, but still led the Maroons in scoring. Stalwart rookie Rhenz Abando, who averaged 11.8 ppg, was benched by UST head coach Aldin Ayo.

For the first time in 23 years (1996), the two teams met in the post-season. The excitement for the semifinals match reached the Supreme Court of the Philippines. Chief Justice Diosdado Peralta, a UST Faculty of Civil Law alumnus predicted in jest a UST victory, commenting in a press conference, "Wala namang laban yung UP, eh. (UP doesn't stand a chance.)" Associate Justice and former UP College of Law dean Marvic Leonen responded on Twitter saying, "I am confident that the true facts of this controversy will be proven without a shadow of the doubt within the next few days. #UPFight" Chief Public Information Officer Brian Hosaka, concluded the press conference saying, "That concludes our program. The Chief Justice expects a UST–Ateneo finals."

In the Game 1 of the semifinals, UST had an early double-digit lead and stayed in control throughout the game. Rhenz Abando and Soulémane Chabi Yo hit 17 points each. Maroon Juan Gomez de Liano scored 20 points in the second half, but Tigers Sherwin Concepcion and Mark Nonoy made key 3-pointers in the last minutes. In Game 2, the Tigers had a dismal shooting and just went 7-of-39 from the 3-point line. Kobe Paras pulled off a dunk at 1:53 minute to give UP a 4-point lead, 65–61. At 23.6 seconds to go, UST's Renzo Subido hit a 3-pointer to get the lead, 66–65. Soulémane Chabi Yo made the last 2 points from the free throw line, sealing the win for UST.

It is interesting to note that Renzo Subido is the son of former UP Fighting Maroon, Henry Subido. The elder Subido played alongside Kobe Paras' father, Benjie Paras, in the 1986 UP champion team.

Among the personalities who watched the games were senators Richard Gordon and Joel Villanueva, UP and UST alumni respectively, UST Medicine alumni Hayden Kho and Vicki Belo (also a UP alumna), media personalities and Thomasians Arnold Clavio and Doland Castro, actor and UP alumnus Richard Gomez and daughter UP freshman, Juliana Gomez, and politician and UP alumnus Gilbert Remulla. GMA News reporters and Thomasians Jun Veneracion, Sandra Aguinaldo, and Cesar Apolinario showed their support in social media. Four-year-old Scarlet Snow Belo, the daughter of Vicki Belo and Hayden Kho, celebrated the UST victory by chanting “Go USTe” on her Instagram.

UST's The Varsitarian reposted the 2-year-old tweet of UP's The Philippine Collegian, "Remedies to sorrow, by St. Thomas Aquinas: the truth, sympathy of friends, crying, sleeping, a nice bath. #UAAPSeason80 #UPFight #taaskamao", as a clapback.

Shortly after the game, the UST Conservatory of Music Brass Band, led by Dean Antonio Africa, held a small parade that set off from the Albertus Magnus Building to the UST Main Building.

2020-2021
On August 21, 2020, UP head coach Bo Perasol confirmed that the UAAP Season 82 UST Growling Tigers captain, CJ Cansino transferred to the UP Fighting Maroons. Cansino was the Juniors MVP in 2017 from UST Junior High School. He placed second in the Seniors Division's Rookie of the Year race behind Ateneo's Ivorian center Angelo Kouame in 2018.

On June 10, 2021, UP Integrated School (UPIS) Junior Maroons Jordi Gómez de Liaño announced his commitment to the UST Growling Tigers. He is the younger brother of Joe, who was a member of the Tigers training pool, and Juan and Javier, who are UP Fighting Maroons and national team standouts. He averaged 13 points, 4.1 rebounds, and 1.8 assists per game for the Junior Maroons in UAAP Season 82 and was part of the Gilas Pilipinas Youth pool for the canceled 2019 FIBA Under-16 Asian Championship.

Results
The two teams play annual and regularly scheduled tournaments since the establishment of National Collegiate Athletic Association in 1924. Their meetings were carried on to the UAAP, which was formed in 1938. The two teams faced each other at least once annually until 1951.

To date, both teams play each other twice in regular season.

Pre-Final Four era

Final Four era

Offseason meetings

Friendship
A UP–UST Friendship Facebook page went online after the 2010 UAAP Cheerdance Competition when the UST Salinggawi Dance Troupe rejoined the UP Pep Squad in the podium finish. The page gained almost 11,000 followers, who are mostly students and alumni of UP and UST, five days after the competition.

In 2011, UST paid tribute to UST High School alumnus and then UP System President Alfredo Pascual by hosting a testimonial dinner at the UST campus. The banquet, arranged at the UST Quadricentennial Park, was attended by a rare collaboration between UST Singers and UP Madrigal Singers. UST, which already owned metal sculptures that consisted of the letters U, S, and T in black and gold, gave UP complementing letter sculptures in maroon and green colors. After nine years, the UST sculpture is installed at the UST Plaza Mayor, while the UP sculpture can still be seen at the UP Sunken Garden.

See also
 La Salle–UST rivalry
 Ateneo–La Salle rivalry
 Battle of the East
 Traditions of the University of Santo Tomas

References

University Athletic Association of the Philippines rivalries
University of Santo Tomas
University of the Philippines Diliman